Dinglishna Hill  is a hill located East of Mount Susitna, in the Matanuska-Susitna Valley of South Central Alaska.

History 
Tanaina Indian name reported in 1958 by USGS.

Etymology 
Dgelishla or Dghelishla in Dena'ina meaning "Little Mountain" is transliterated as "Dinglishna".

Description 

Location 
Dinglishna Hill is a hill located East of Mount Susitna, West of Alexander Creek and the big Susitna River, South-West of Susitna, and North of Alexander in the Matanuska-Susitna Valley of South Central Alaska.
It is also the name of the Dinglishna Hills subdivision of the Matanuska-Susitna Borough, Alaska.

Terrain 
The hill slopes down gradually until it reaches Alexander Creek near the confluence with the big Susitna River.

Vegetation 
The hill and its surroundings are vegetated with birch, spruce and low lying shrubs.  The soil in the area is well-drained.

Notes

References

General references 

Kari, James; James A. Fall (2003). Shem Pete's Alaska: The Territory of the Upper Cook Inlet Dena'ina, 2nd ed., University of Alaska Press, 112. .

External links 

Landforms of Matanuska-Susitna Borough, Alaska
Hills of Alaska